Esat Oktay Yıldıran (15 February 1949 – 22 October 1988) was a Turkish military officer who was appointed governor of the Diyarbakır Prison after the 1980 Turkish coup d'état. Yıldıran became known for his extensive torture of PKK aligned Kurds in the Diyarbakır Prison. Many inmates either committed suicide or died on hunger strikes in the penitentiary.

Career 
After the Turkish Invasion of Cyprus in 1974, Yıldıran was promoted to Major. In 1980, after the military coup which took place the same year, he was sent to the Diyarbakır Prison by Kenan Evren in person. He tortured inmates in the prison with methods that were compared to Nazi methods, and he viewed the prison as a school in which inmates would be subjected to Turkification. Yıldıran beat, coerced and tortured the male and female prisoners. Under his force, inmates were forced to eat human excrement, doused in sewer water, tortured with electric shocks and such other torture methods. Yıldıran had a German shepherd called "Co" ("Joe"), which was trained to bite the genitals of naked prisoners; all inmates were obligated to salute the dog.

Assassination 

On 22 October 1988, Yıldıran was on a public bus which stopped by at a station, and 2 suspects entered the bus and sat behind him. After the bus halted at another stop, moments later the doors opened one of the two suspects opened fired. He was shot dead on the bus in Ümraniye, Istanbul.

According to some reports, his firing assassin yelled "Laz Kemal sends greetings" (referring to one of the inmates, Kemal Pri) before shooting him. He died in front of his wife and two children. On the 26th of October, he was buried and declared a martyr by the government.

The PKK took responsibility of the attack, after an unanimous man contacted the Cumhuriyet Gazétte later that day and stated that; “Esat Oktay Yıldıran, who was punished in Kısıklı today, was killed by the PKK. Biji Partiye Karkaren Kurdistan.”

As a result the two suspects were identified as members of the PKK, but never fully identified and were never caught.

Aftermath 
Yıldıran's torture methods were the subject of the Turkish television series “Bu Kalp Seni Unutur mu?” Various books have also been written about Yıldıran's torture practices. One of the most famous books is Mehdi Zana's "Hell No. 5. Diary from a Turkish Prison". Yıldıran was honored as a hero and martyr by Turkish nationalists. In 2010 the Fatih City Council removed his name from a memorial.

In 2013, a Turkish court sentenced the journalist Rasim Ozan Kütahyalı to a suspended prison term of ten months and fined him for writing that Yıldıran was a torturer.

References 

Turkish military officers
1949 births
1988 deaths
People murdered in Turkey
Deaths by firearm in Turkey
Turkish military personnel of the Cyprus conflicts
Murder in Ümraniye
1988 murders in Turkey